Astroblepus grixalvii is a species of catfish of the family Astroblepidae. It can be found in Colombia and Ecuador.

Astroblepus grixalvii is found in the higher basin of the Magdalena-Cauca rivers in Colombia where it is common. In Ecuador it is found in the Esmeraldas and Guayas basin where it is uncommon. It can be found between 1,200 and 2,800 m in altitude.

Named in memory of Don Mariano Grixalva.

References

Bibliography 
 Eschmeyer, William N., ed. 1998. Catalog of Fishes. Special Publication of the Center for Biodiversity Research and Information, num. 1, vol. 1–3. California Academy of Sciences. San Francisco, California, United States. 2905. .

Astroblepus
Freshwater fish of Colombia
Magdalena River
Taxa named by Alexander von Humboldt
Fish described in 1805